Coprozercon scopaeus is a species of mite, placed in its own family, Coprozerconidae, in the order Mesostigmata. It was described in 1999 from the feces of the Allegheny woodrat, Neotoma magister, in a cave in Kentucky.

References

Mesostigmata
Arachnids of North America
Fauna of the Southeastern United States
Endemic fauna of the United States
Monotypic arachnid genera